The 1997 Ole Miss Rebels football team represented the University of Mississippi during the 1997 NCAA Division I-A football season.  They participated as members of the Southeastern Conference in the West Division.  Coached by Tommy Tuberville, the Rebels played their home games at Vaught–Hemingway Stadium in Oxford, Mississippi.

Schedule

*Schedule Source:

Roster

Game summaries

vs. Marshall (Motor City Bowl)

References

Ole Miss
Ole Miss Rebels football seasons
Little Caesars Pizza Bowl champion seasons
Ole Miss Rebels football